Charles McLean may refer to:

Charles McLean (football coach) (born 1959), football coach from Cayman Islands
Charles McLean (rugby union) (1892–1965), New Zealand rugby union player

See also
Charles Maclean (disambiguation)
Charles McLean Andrews